Pascal Bonafoux (born 1949) is a French writer, novelist, art critic and art historian, a specialist in self-portraiture. He collaborates with various newspapers and magazines, he is the author of numerous essays dedicated to art and was a resident at the French Academy in Rome. He is professor of art history at Paris 8 University, and is also a curator who organises exhibitions either in France or abroad.

Biography 
Bonafoux was born in Paris in 1949. After his doctoral dissertation  ('Self-Portrait in Western Painting'), he resided at the Villa Medici in Italy from 1980 to 1981, where he wrote essays for the French Academy in Rome and fell in love with this country – the genius of Leonardo da Vinci, Michelangelo or Giuseppe Verdi; the beauty of its churches and palaces; the charm of its squares, terraces and alleys. Since then, he has continued to travel the peninsula to explore its rich art and culture.

He has curated various exhibitions devoted to Rembrandt, Van Gogh, Renoir and Monet, as well as those dedicated to the works of contemporary artists in Bratislava, Dublin, Prague, Tel Aviv, East Asia, et cetera. In 1988 and 1990, he chaired the jury of the first two biennials of film about art at Centre Georges Pompidou.

As a journalist, he has collaborated with various newspapers and magazines, including Connaissance des Arts, L'ŒIL, L'OBS, Le Magazine Littéraire, Le Monde ... He is currently a columnist of the French magazine .

Bonafoux is also a professor who teaches art history at the Paris 8 University and has been leading conferences on topics related to art history for the reference organisation Clio, to quality audiences as well as to amateurs and the curious.

He has published more than 20 books at Éditions Gallimard, including , a heavily illustrated book for the pocket collection "Découvertes Gallimard", which was one of the bestsellers in France.

Selected publications 
 Portraits of the Artist: The Self-Portrait in Painting, Rizzoli International Publications, 1985
 Rembrandt: Self-Portrait, Rizzoli International Publications, 1985
 The Impressionists: Portraits and Confidences, Rizzoli International Publications, 1986
 Van Gogh : Le soleil en face, collection « Découvertes Gallimard » (nº 17), série Arts. Éditions Gallimard, 1987
 UK edition – Van Gogh: The Passionate Eye, 'New Horizons' series, Thames & Hudson, 1992
 US edition – Van Gogh: The Passionate Eye, "Abrams Discoveries" series. Harry N. Abrams, 1992
 Van Gogh: Self Portraits With Accompanying Letters from Vincent to His Brother Theo, Wellfleet Press, 1989
 Rembrandt : Le clair, l'obscur, collection « Découvertes Gallimard » (nº 76), série Arts. Éditions Gallimard, 1990
 UK edition – Rembrandt: Substance and Shadow, 'New Horizons' series. Thames & Hudson, 1992
 US edition – Rembrandt: Master of the Portrait, "Abrams Discoveries" series. Harry N. Abrams, 1992
 A Weekend with Rembrandt, Rizzoli, 1992
 Van Gogh, Konecky & Konecky, 1998
 Vermeer, William S. Konecky Associates, 1999
 Van Gogh : L'atelier d'Arles, collection « Découvertes Gallimard Hors série ». Éditions Gallimard, 2002
 Autoportraits du XXe siècle, collection « Découvertes Gallimard Hors série ». Éditions Gallimard, 2004
 Chefs-d'œuvre de la Collection Phillips, collection « Découvertes Gallimard Hors série ». Éditions Gallimard, 2005
 With David Rosenberg, Louvre Game Book: Play with the Largest Museum in the World, Assouline Publishing, 2005
 With Catherine Alestchenkoff, Yves Clerc, Skira, 2008
 With Gilles Targat, Behind the Scenes in Versailles, Hachette-Livre, 2010
 Cézanne, portrait, Hazan, 2011
 Rodin & Eros, Thames & Hudson, 2013

References 

1949 births
French curators
French art critics
French art historians
20th-century French writers
Officiers of the Ordre des Arts et des Lettres
Rembrandt scholars
Living people